The Woman I Am is the eighth studio album by American R&B/funk singer Chaka Khan, released on Warner Bros. Records in 1992. It was Khan's first studio album since 1988's CK and due to artistic differences between Khan and Warner Bros. Records it was also to be her final full-length release for the label. The entire album is dedicated to her friend Miles Davis, who died the previous year.

Composition
The album mainly focuses on material from the contemporary R&B, soul and funk genres and was Khan's debut as executive producer in charge of production. The main producer on the album was the Grammy Award winning jazz multi-instrumentalist Marcus Miller but it also includes Khan's first collaborations with Arif Mardin since 1986's Destiny; "This Time" and the closing track "Don't Look at Me That Way", both co-produced by Mardin's son Joe Mardin. "Love You All My Lifetime" saw Khan teaming up with Scritti Politti's David Gamson – who incidentally had also produced the opening track on Destiny with its confusingly similar title; "Love of a Lifetime". The single track "I Want" features a guest appearance by William Galison on harmonica and the suggestive ballad "You Can Make the Story Right" was recorded with bassist and producer Wayne Braithwaite, best known for his work with Will Downing and Kenny G.

Singles
The Woman I Am includes seven single releases; "Love You All My Lifetime" written by German composer duo Klarmann/Weber which became a number one on Billboard'''s Dance Singles chart as well as #2 on R&B (Pop #68, UK #49), "You Can Make the Story Right" written by Gabrielle Goodman & Wayne Bathwaite reached #8 on the US R&B Billboard charts, "I Want" (US R&B #62), "Give Me All", "Facts of Love" and the Diane Warren-penned ballad "Don't Look at Me That Way" (UK #73), "The Woman I Am" written by Dyan Cannon, Chaka Khan & Brenda Russell, failed to chart in the UK.  Both lead single "Love You All My Lifetime" and "Give Me All" were issued in a wide variety of dance remixes by among others Frankie Knuckles.

Commercial successThe Woman I Am became Khan's highest-charting album on the US R&B Albums chart since 1984's I Feel for You, peaking at #9. The album won Khan a Grammy Award for Best R&B Vocal Performance, Female in 1993.

Since Khan's 1995 album Dare You to Love Me was shelved by the Warner Bros. Records label and instead only partly made available on greatest hits compilations and movie soundtracks, it was to be six years before she released another full-length album, the Prince co-produced Come 2 My House on his label NPG Records.

As of 2005, The Woman I Am has sold 197,000 copies in United States according to Nielsen SoundScan.

Critical reception
In his review of The Woman I Am, AllMusic's Alex Henderson describes the album as "high-tech, yet warm instead of mechanical. And on songs ranging from the melancholy "Telephone" to the introspective title song and the appealing single "Love You All My Lifetime," it's clear that Khan was given strong material to work with."

Track listing
"Everything Changes" (Khan, Ben Marguiles) – 4:38
"Give Me All" (Jerry Barnes, Katreese Barnes) – 4:24
"Telephone" (Hans-Jürgen Buchner, Khan) – 4:21 (4:06 on LP)
"Keep Givin' Me Lovin'" (Camus Mare Celli, Khan, Andres Levin, Mica Paris) – 4:32
"Facts of Love" (Werner Hammer, Khan, Harald Schneck, Ralf Zang) – 4:35
"Love You All My Lifetime" (Irmgard Klarmann, Felix Weber) – 4:43 (4:16 on LP)
"I Want" (Donald D. Bowden, Janice Dempsey, James McKinney) – 5:50 (4:20 on LP)
"You Can Make the Story Right" (Wayne Braithwaite, Gabrielle Goodman) – 6:32 (4:49 on LP)
"Be My Eyes" (Daryll Duncan, Khan) – 4:24 (3:50 on LP)
"This Time" (David Lasley, Robin Lerner, Marsha Malamet) – 5:16
"The Woman I Am" (Dyan Cannon, Khan, Brenda Russell) – 5:09 (4:52 on LP)
"Love With No Strings" (Wesley Magoogan, Maggie Ryder) – 5:00 (not included on LP)
"Don't Look at Me That Way" (Diane Warren) – 4:50 (4:20 on LP)

Personnel
Production
 Chaka Khan – executive producer in charge of production (entire album), producer track: 9
 Benny Medina and Steve Margo – executive album producers
 Marcus Miller – producer tracks: 1, 3, 7, 11
 Jerry Barnes – producer track: 2
 Katreese Barnes – producer track: 2
 Ralf Zang – producer tracks: 4, 5
 David Gamson – producer track: 6
 Wayne Braithwaite – producer track: 8
 Gary Haase – producer track: 9, 12
 George Whitty – producer track: 9, 12
 Arif Mardin – producer tracks: 10, 13
 Joe Mardin – producer tracks: 10, 13

Other notable personnel
 Terry Burrus – synthesizer solo track: 1
 Steve Ferrone – drums track: 1, 3
 Gene Williams – programming, synthesizer track: 2
 Ras Tschaka Tonge – timbales track: 3
 Abraham Laboriel – bass guitar track: 6
 Bobby Lyle – Rhodes and clavinet track: 6
 William Galison – harmonica track: 7
 George Whitty – programming, synthesizer, piano, bass guitar and drums tracks: 9, 12
 Everette Harp – alto saxophone track: 11
 Anthony Jackson – bass guitar track: 12
 Dave Koz – saxophone track: 13
 Bryan Sutton – guitar
 Wah Wah Watson – guitar track: 6
 Jeff Pevar - guitar track 3

Non-album tracks and remixes
 "Love You All My Lifetime" (Album Version Edit) – 4:18
 "Love You All My Lifetime" (Love Suite 12" Mix Act 1) – 8:15
 "Love You All My Lifetime" (Love Suite 12" Mix Act 2 Dub) – 4:25
 "Love You All My Lifetime" (The Diva Edit) – 8:01
 "Love You All My Lifetime" (Diva Dub) – 7:03
 "Love You All My Lifetime" (Garage Mix W/Strings) – 6:50
 "Love You All My Lifetime" (House Mix) – 6:50
 "Love You All My Lifetime" (Love And Kisses Breakdown Mix) – 7:06
 "Love You All My Lifetime (Single Remix) – 4:02
 "Give Me All" (Classic Club Mix) – 6:22
 "Give Me All" (Extended Version R&B) – 7:13
 "Give Me All" (Fierce Club Version) – 7:00

Charts

Weekly charts

Year-end charts

References

External linksThe Woman I Am'' at Discogs

1992 albums
Chaka Khan albums
Albums produced by Arif Mardin
Albums produced by Marcus Miller
Warner Records albums